Eurythrips is a genus of thrips in the family Phlaeothripidae.

Species
 Eurythrips alarius
 Eurythrips ampliventralis
 Eurythrips batesi
 Eurythrips bifasciatus
 Eurythrips bisetosus
 Eurythrips citricollis
 Eurythrips citricornis
 Eurythrips conformis
 Eurythrips costalimai
 Eurythrips cruralis
 Eurythrips defectus
 Eurythrips dissimilis
 Eurythrips edwini
 Eurythrips elongatus
 Eurythrips forticornis
 Eurythrips fuscipennis
 Eurythrips genarum
 Eurythrips hemimeres
 Eurythrips hindsi
 Eurythrips hookae
 Eurythrips longilabris
 Eurythrips modestus
 Eurythrips musivi
 Eurythrips nigriceps
 Eurythrips nigricornis
 Eurythrips peccans
 Eurythrips pettiti
 Eurythrips pusillus
 Eurythrips saidamhedi
 Eurythrips setosus
 Eurythrips simplex
 Eurythrips striolatus
 Eurythrips subflavus
 Eurythrips tarsalis
 Eurythrips trifasciatus
 Eurythrips tristis
 Eurythrips umbrisetis
 Eurythrips virginianus
 Eurythrips watsoni

References

Phlaeothripidae
Thrips
Thrips genera